The Hanshin Himba Stakes Japanese 阪神牝馬ステークス} is a Japanese Grade 2 flat horse race in Japan for Thoroughbreds fillies and mares of at least four years of age. It is run over a distance of 1400 metres at Hanshin Racecourse in April.

The Hanshin Himba Stakes was first run in 1958. It was elevated to Grade 3 status in 1984 and has been run as a grade 2 race since 1998. The race was contested over a variety of distances before being run over 2000 metres from 1968 until 1995. The distance was reduced to 1600 metres in 1996 and to 1400 metres in 2006. The race returned to 1600 metres in 2016.

Among the winners of the race have been Fine Motion, Admire Groove, Rhein Kraft, Curren Chan and Mikki Queen.

Winners since 2000

Earlier winners

See also
 Horse racing in Japan
 List of Japanese flat horse races

References

Turf races in Japan